Moses Vita Ascarelli (5 April 1826 – 11 December 1889), also known by the pen name Emet le-Ya'akov, was an Italian physician, rabbi, writer, poet, and translator.

Biography
Moses Vita Ascarelli was born to a Jewish family in Rome in 1826. He received his religious education at the Talmud Torah and Rabbinical College in that city, and later studied medicine at the University of Rome. He distinguished himself during the cholera epidemic in 1867, in recognition of which he received a medal from Pope Pius IX.

Ascarelli was a frequent contributor under the pseudonym "Emet le-Ya'akov" to the Hebrew journal Ha-Maggid, for which he wrote many poems and articles on the condition of Italian Jews under Pope Pius IX. Ascarelli translated from Hebrew into Italian the work Naḥalah le-Yisrael ('A Heritage unto Israel'), a responsum sent by Chief Rabbi Israel Moses Hazan in connection with a disputed inheritance in the Gallichi family. Ascarelli also published Sefer 'am Polanim ve-gere Polanim, a translation of Adam Mickiewicz's Księgi narodu polskiego i pielgrzymstwa polskiego from Armand Lévy's French translation. He served as rabbi of the Scola Catalana synagogue, and one of his sermons was published under the title Panegirico sull' elezione d'Israele letto nel Tempio israelitico di Roma (Scuola Catalana) il Sciavuot 5640 (17 maggio 1880) per l'iniziazione alla maggiorità religiose del figlio Angelo Raffaele e altri giovanetti della Communione.

References
 

1826 births
1889 deaths
19th-century Italian physicians
19th-century Italian rabbis
19th-century translators
19th-century Italian poets
Rabbis from Rome
Writers from Rome
Physicians from Rome
Jewish poets
French–Hebrew translators
Translators to Italian
Translators from Hebrew
Sapienza University of Rome alumni
Jewish Italian writers